Quicksand is a 2002 album by Canadian-American alternative hip hop artist Noah23. Most of the album's production was handled by Orphan, the Plague Language collective's most prolific producer at the time.

The track "Crypto Sporidian" was released as a split single with the track "Deadly Rays" from fellow Plague Language member Baracuda's debut album Tetragammoth. Both tracks were produced by Orphan.

Critical reception 
Allmusic gave the album a rating of 4 out of 5 stars. Exclaim! wrote that the album "can rock the parties ("Digestive Enzymes"), the dance floors ("Resistance"), headphones ("Hourglass") and the art fags ("The Fall") all while maintaining a cohesive sound."

Track listing

See also
2002 in hip hop music

References

2002 albums
Noah23 albums